Jerry Keefe is the current head coach for Northeastern. Previously he served as an assistant for 10 years, taking over for Jim Madigan when his predecessor was promoted to Athletic Director.

Career
Keefe began his college career with Providence in 1996. After two pedestrian seasons, Keefe's production exploded as a junior, more than doubling his career totals in one season. He was honored as the most improved player in New England and helped the Friars climb to 4th in the conference. Keefe wasn't able to keep up the pace in his senior season and he left the Friars mid-way through the year to pursue a professional career.

Keefe's abbreviated first season as a pro went fairly well. Though he didn't catch on in the AHL, he became a near point-per-game player for the Trenton Titans and helped the team reach the Turner Cup semifinals, finishing second in postseason scoring. Despite the success, Keefe headed to Europe and played for the Belfast Giants in the team's inaugural season. Keefe had a fairly bland year and joined the Cardiff Devils at the start of the 2002 season. He left after 9 games and returned across the Atlantic, finishing out the year with the Atlantic City Boardwalk Bullies.

After a year off, Keefe returned to the game with the Orlando Seals but injuries limited him to 33 games. He signed a contract to continue with the Seals the following year, however, due to a disagreement with the WHA, the entire league shut down after 2004 and Keefe decided to call it a career.

Keefe began his coaching career with Massachusetts–Boston but left after one year to take over at Westfield State. The Owls were a club team at the time but returned to varsity status in 2008. Keefe oversaw a swift rebuild and got the team to post a winning season as they joined Division III competition. Keefe jumped up to Division I in 2009, joining Brown as an assistant in 2009. Two years later he transitioned into a similar role with Northeastern when Jim Madigan took over. Keefe remained with the Huskies for a decade, helping build the program into a Hockey East power and getting the program to three NCAA Tournaments.

When Jeff Konya left his position as Athletic Director to take over the same role at San Jose State, Northeastern acted quickly and promoted Madigan to AD while advancing Keefe to head coach within a week.

Statistics

Regular season and playoffs

Head coaching record

References

External links

1976 births
Living people
Ice hockey coaches from Massachusetts
People from Billerica, Massachusetts
American men's ice hockey centers
Omaha Lancers players
Providence Friars men's ice hockey players
Cincinnati Mighty Ducks players
Trenton Titans players
Belfast Giants players
Cardiff Devils players
Atlantic City Boardwalk Bullies players
Orlando Seals (WHA2) players
Charlotte Checkers (1993–2010) players
Northeastern Huskies men's ice hockey coaches
Ice hockey players from Massachusetts
American expatriate ice hockey players in Wales
American expatriate ice hockey players in Northern Ireland